Starry Night   (September 1888), commonly known as Starry Night Over the Rhône, is one of Vincent van Gogh's paintings of Arles at night. It was painted on the bank of the Rhône that was only a one or two-minute walk from the Yellow House on the Place Lamartine, which Van Gogh was renting at the time. The night sky and the effects of light at night provided the subject for some of van Gogh's more famous paintings, including Café Terrace at Night (painted earlier the same month) and the June, 1889, canvas from Saint-Remy, The Starry Night.

A sketch of the painting is included in a letter van Gogh sent to his friend Eugène Boch on 2 October 1888.

Starry Night, which is now in the Musée d'Orsay in Paris, was first exhibited in 1889 at Paris' annual exhibition of the Société des Artistes Indépendants. It was shown together with van Gogh's Irises, which was added by Vincent's brother, Theo, although Vincent had proposed including one of his paintings from the public gardens in Arles.

Subject matter

The view is from the quay on the east side of the Rhône, into the knee of the river towards the western shore: coming down from the north, the Rhône turns to the right at this point to surround the rocks on which Arles is built. From the towers of Saint-Julien and Saint-Trophime at the left, the spectator follows the east bank up to the iron bridge connecting Arles to the suburb of Trinquetaille on the right, western bank. This implies a view from Place Lamartine towards the southwest.
  Though, as noted below this is not consistent with the stars portrayed as the Plough in Ursa Major would not be visible in that direction.

Genesis

Van Gogh announced and described this composition in a letter to his brother Theo:

In reality, the view depicted in the painting faces away from Ursa Major, which is to the north. The foreground indicates heavy rework, wet-in-wet, as soon as the first state was finished. The letter sketches executed at this time probably are based on the original composition.

Colours of the night
The challenge of painting at night intrigued van Gogh. The vantage point he chose for Starry Night allowed him to capture the reflections of the gas lighting in Arles across the glimmering blue water of the Rhône. In the foreground, two lovers stroll by the banks of the river.

Depicting colour was of great importance to Vincent; in letters to his brother, Theo, he often described objects in his paintings in terms of colour. His night paintings, including Starry Night, emphasize the importance he placed on capturing the sparkling colors of the night sky and of the artificial lighting that was new to the era.

References

Sources
 Boime, Albert: Van Gogh's Starry Night: A History of Matter and a Matter of History . Arts Magazine. 59 (4): 86–103. (also available on CD-ROM:  (German version))
 Dorn, Roland: Décoration: Vincent van Gogh's Werkreihe für das Gelbe Haus in Arles, Georg Olms Verlag, Hildesheim, Zürich & New York 1990  / ISSN 0175-9558

External links 
 

Paintings by Vincent van Gogh
Paintings of Arles by Vincent van Gogh
1888 paintings
Paintings in the collection of the Musée d'Orsay
Ships in art